Happy Birthday is a 1998 Russian drama film produced in monochrome written and directed by Larisa Sadilova.

Plot
Happy Birthday follows events during a day at a Russian maternity hospital, focussing on several women who are patients there.

Cast
 Patrick Baehr as Kai Leist
 Gulya Stolyarova
 Irina Prosyina
 Eugene Turkina
 Lyuba Starkova
 Masha Kuzmina
 Rano Kubaeva

Awards
 1998: Cottbus Film Festival of Young East European Cinema
 FIPRESCI Prize (Larisa Sadilova)
 Honorable Mention for Feature Film Competition (Larisa Sadilova)
 1999: Créteil International Women's Film Festival
 Grand Prix (Larisa Sadilova)

External links
 
 

1998 films
Russian black-and-white films
1998 drama films
1990s Russian-language films
Films directed by Larisa Sadilova
Russian drama films
Films scored by Georgy Sviridov